James Kendrick Lindsey (January 24, 1899 – October 25, 1963) was an American Major League Baseball pitcher from 1922 to 1937. He helped the Cardinals win the 1930 National League pennant and win the 1931 World Series.

In 9 seasons Lindsey had a 21–20 win–loss record, 177 games, 20 games started, 5 complete games, 1 shutout, 80 games finished, 19 saves, 431 innings pitched, 507 hits, 261 runs, 225 earned runs, 25 home runs allowed, 176 walks allowed, 175 strikeouts, 12 hit batsmen, 9 wild pitches, 1,943 batters faced, 3 balks and a 4.70 ERA.

In 1938, Lindsey was one of three managers of the Dayton Ducks of the Middle Atlantic League.

Born in Greensburg, Louisiana, Lindsey died in Jackson, Louisiana, at the age of 64.

References

External links

1899 births
1963 deaths
Major League Baseball pitchers
Brooklyn Dodgers players
Cleveland Indians players
St. Louis Cardinals players
Cincinnati Reds players
Baseball players from Louisiana
Minor league baseball managers
Milwaukee Brewers (minor league) players
Kansas City Blues (baseball) players
Dallas Steers players
San Antonio Bears players
Houston Buffaloes players
Columbus Red Birds players
Rochester Red Wings players
Atlanta Crackers players
Chattanooga Lookouts players
Little Rock Travelers players
People from Greensburg, Louisiana